Daria-Larissa Maritczak is an Austrian former ice dancer. With Ihor-Andrij Maritczak, she became a two-time Austrian national champion. They competed at five ISU Championships, including the 1991 World Championships in Munich, Germany, and 1992 European Championships in Lausanne, Switzerland. Their best result, 12th, came at the 1992 World Junior Championships in Hull, Quebec, Canada.

As of 2017, Maritczak is working as an orthopedic surgeon in Vienna.

Competitive highlights 
With Ihor-Andrij Maritczak

References

External links 
 

1970s births
Austrian female ice dancers
Living people
Figure skaters from Vienna